Harbour City may refer to:

 Harbour City (Hong Kong), a shopping centre
 Harbor City, Los Angeles, the community in Los Angeles
 Harbour City tram stop, a tram stop in Greater Manchester
 Kaohsiung, nicknamed "the harbour city" for having the biggest port in Taiwan
 Nanaimo, British Columbia, officially called "The Harbour City"
 Sydney, nicknamed "the Harbour City"
 Harbor City Capital, a Florida-based alternative investment firm employing George Santos during 2020–2021

See also 

 Harbour Town
 Harbor Town
 Harbour Centre